Konrad Maria Eusebius Prinz zu Hohenlohe-Waldenburg-Schillingsfürst (16 December 1863 – 21 December 1918) was an Austrian aristocrat and statesman.  He briefly served as Prime Minister of Austria (Cisleithania) in Austria-Hungary in 1906.

Life
Prince Konrad was born in Vienna, the son of Prince Konstantin of Hohenlohe-Schillingsfürst (1828–1896), k.u.k. Chief Intendant and General of the Cavalry, and his wife Marie née Princess of Sayn-Wittgenstein-Berleburg (1837–1920), a daughter of Carolyne zu Sayn-Wittgenstein, known for her liaison with Franz Liszt. By his father, Konrad was a nephew of Victor I, Duke of Ratibor, of Chlodwig, Prince of Hohenlohe-Schillingsfürst (Chancellor of Germany 1894-1900), and of Gustav Adolf, Cardinal Prince of Hohenlohe-Schillingsfürst.

Prince Konrad attended the Schottengymnasium and went on to study law at the University of Vienna from 1883 to 1887. He entered the Cisleithanian civil service in Prague and later worked at the k.k. Ministry of the Interior. Appointed district officer (Bezirkshauptmann) in Teplitz-Schönau, Bohemia, he proved to be a man of conciliation and social justice, when he achieved settlement of a miners' strike and granted permission for performance of Hauptmann's socially critical play The Weavers, which earned him the nickname "Red Prince".

In 1888 Prince Konrad married Countess Franziska von Schönborn-Buchheim (1866-1937). One of their six children, Princess Franziska of Hohenlohe-Waldenburg-Schillingsfürst (1897-1989), by her marriage with Archduke Maximilian Eugen of Austria, became the sister-in-law of Archduke Karl Franz of Austria, the last Emperor of Austria.

In 1903/04, Prince Konrad served as k.k. Stadtholder (Steward) of the Bukovina in Czernowitz, and from 1904 as Stadtholder of the Austrian Littoral in Trieste. A confidant of the heir to the throne, Archduke Franz Ferdinand, he was appointed Minister-President of Cisleithania on 2 May 1906, in order to push through an electoral reform establishing universal male suffrage in elections to the Imperial Council, where his predecessor Paul Gautsch von Frankenthurn had failed. Prince Konrad tried to mobilize the votes of the Italian representatives in the Council against a "Slavic" block, but did not succeed in achieving a majority. He resigned within one month and returned to Trieste. It was left to his successor Max Wladimir von Beck to get the new electoral law passed.

Prince Konrad remained Stadtholder of the Littoral until 1915. He had to cope with rising Italian irredentism and his measures of centralization in favour of the Vienna government met with strong protest. When the Kingdom of Italy threatened to join the Entente Powers, he resigned and temporarily joined the Imperial-Royal Landwehr forces on the Eastern Front. Back in Vienna he assumed the office of k.k. Minister of the Interior on 30 November 1915 in the cabinet of Minister-President Count Karl von Stürgkh. As minister, he evolved plans of re-arranging the Austro-Hungarian dual monarchy into a federation of four major states: Austria proper, Hungary, Poland (Galicia), and "Illyria" (i.e. Croatia-Slavonia, Bosnia and Herzegovina, and Dalmatia). However, those plans were rejected mainly by Hungarian politicians.

Prince Konrad resigned as Interior Minister on 31 October 1916, shortly after Minister-President Stürgkh was assassinated by Friedrich Adler. From 2 December 1916 he served for three weeks as Joint Finance Minister of Austria-Hungary, before he was succeeded by Stephan Burián von Rajecz on 22 December. Also from 2 December he was a member of the Austrian House of Lords until its dissolution in November 1918. In 1917 emperor Charles I made him Obersthofmeister (Grand Master of the Court). With the end of World War I he retired from politics, and died shortly afterwards while hunting in Kammern im Liesingtal, Styria.

External links 
 Hohenlohe on Encyclopedia of Austria
 Hohenlohe on Austrian Commanders

See also 
 Konstantin zu Hohenlohe-Schillingsfürst (de)
 Marie zu Hohenlohe-Schillingsfürst (de)
 Hohenlohe-Waldenburg-Schillingsfürst, Hohenlohe-Schillingsfürst

1863 births
1918 deaths
20th-century Ministers-President of Austria
Politicians from Vienna
Politicians of Bukovina
19th-century Austrian people
Finance ministers of Austria-Hungary
Ministers-President of Austria
Austrian people of German descent
Konrad
Austrian princes
Knights of the Golden Fleece of Austria
Obersthofmeister